Rajesh Shringarpure (born 29 October 1977) is an Indian film and television actor who appears in Hindi cinema and Marathi cinema.He is currently playing the role of Malhar Rao Holkar in television serial Punyashlok Ahilyabai on which is being aired on Sony Television.

Rajesh is best known for his negative role in Sarkar Raj. He also played an important role in Murder 3. He is known for his brawny looks. He played the role of Seleucus I Nicator in the TV series Chandragupta Maurya (2011). In  2018, Shringarpure has participated in the first season of Bigg Boss Marathi (season 1), which airs on Colors Marathi.

Career
Shringarpure worked in a Hindi serial, Sahib Biwi Gulam, co-starring Raveena Tandon and Ayub Khan, on Sahara One. He also did serials including Saarrthi on Star Plus as Lord Krishna) and Char Divas Sasuche, a Marathi daily on ETV Marathi. He gained popularity from films including Zenda and Swarajya Marathi Paul Padate Pudhe.
He was also the All India parade commander at Rajpath.

In 2012, Rajesh played Waseem, a Central Intelligence Agency (CIA) agent in the John Stockwell-directed Seal Team Six: The Raid on Osama Bin Laden, which recently premiered in the US prior to the US presidential elections. He has completed shooting for another Hollywood project titled Gandhi Of The Month, in which he worked with American actor Harvey Keitel. Rajesh is also working on Shortcut Romeo, followed by a crossover film that stars Dev Patel, where he plays a villain.

Filmography
 1995 - Param Vir Chakra as Army officer Rajesh
 2008 - Sarkar Raj as Sanjay Somji
 2008 - Mi Amruta Boltey (Marathi)
 2010 - Shri Shambu Maza Navsacha (Marathi)
 2011 - Chitkabrey - The Shades of Grey as Joginder Singh Grewal / Jaggi
 2011 - Swarajya as Ram Pathare
 2012 - Matter (2012 film) as Ronnie (Marathi)
 2012 - Chakradhar as Devraj
 2012 - Seal Team Six: The Raid on Osama Bin Laden as CIA agent Waseem
 2013 - Murder 3 as Police officer Kabir
 2013 - Shortcut Romeo as Rahul
 2013 - Ek Thi Rani Aisi Bhi as Madhorao Scindia
 2013 - Gandhi Of The Month as Dr. Shailesh Nathu
 2014 - Sangharsh as Ravi Shinde alias Bhau
 2015 - Yudh as Guru Nayak
 2015 - Guru Dakshina
 2016 - Direct Ishq as Rawde Bhau
 2016 - Kaul Manacha (Marathi)
 2017 - Daddy as Ram Naik
 2017 - Love Betting
 2019 - Nashibvaan as Dhananjay Jadhav (Marathi)
 2019 - Kulkarni Chaukatla Deshpande as Satish (Marathi)
 2019 - Romeo Akbar Walter as Prasoon Awasthi

Television
 1999 - 2000 Om Namah Shivay as Arjuna
 1999 - 2000 Jai Mata Ki as Agni Dev & Lord Vishnu 
 2001 Draupadi as Arjuna
 2001 Jaane Anjaane as Badal
 2001 - 2013 Char Divas Sasuche
 2002  Ghar Sansaar as Amit
 2003 Shree Ganesh as Maharaj Nala
 2004 Sahib Biwi Gulam as Bhootnath
 2004 - 2005 Om Namo Narayan as Bhagwan Shiv
 2004 - 2008 Saarrthi as Krishna
 2007 - 2008 Sangam as Shekhar Bhatia
 2009 Basera as Sachin Deshmukh
 2010 Ek Chutki Aasman as Ganesh
 2010 Krishnaben Khakhrawala as Ravi Patel
 2011 Sanskaar Laxmi  as Harsukh Purohit
 2011 Chandragupta Maurya as Seleucus I Nikator
 2014 Encounter as Shankar (Shankya) Mane (Episode 1 - Episode 3)
 2017 Meri Durga as Coach Rajveer Rana
 2018 Bigg Boss Marathi (season 1) as Contestant (evicted on day 35) 
 2019 Jhansi Ki Rani as Morapant Tambe
2021–present Punyashlok Ahilyabai as Malhar Rao Holkar

References

External links 
 
 

Indian male film actors
Male actors in Hindi cinema
Living people
Place of birth missing (living people)
Bigg Boss Marathi contestants
1977 births